Metropolis was an ancient town in the southern part of Phrygia, belonging to the conventus of Apamea. That this town is different from the more northerly town of the name in northern Phrygia, is quite evident, even independently of the fact that Stephanus of Byzantium mentions two towns of the name of Metropolis in Phrygia, and that Hierocles. and the Notitiae speak of a town of this name in two different provinces of Phrygia. In Roman times, it was assigned to the province of Pisidia, where it became a bishopric. No longer a residential see, it remains, under the name Metropolis in Pisidia, a titular see of the Roman Catholic Church.

Modern scholars locate its site near Tatarlı, Afyonkarahisar Province, Asian Turkey.

References

Populated places in Phrygia
Populated places in Pisidia
Catholic titular sees in Asia
Populated places of the Byzantine Empire
Roman towns and cities in Turkey
Former populated places in Turkey
History of Afyonkarahisar Province
Dinar District